Ferrocenium tetrafluoroborate is an organometallic compound with the formula [Fe(C5H5)2]BF4.  This salt is composed of the cation [Fe(C5H5)2]+ and the tetrafluoroborate anion.  The related hexafluorophosphate is also a popular reagent with similar properties.  The cation is often abbreviated Fc+ or Cp2Fe+.  The salt is deep blue in color and paramagnetic.
Ferrocenium salts are sometimes used as one-electron oxidizing agents, and the reduced product, ferrocene, is inert and readily separated from ionic products.  The ferrocene–ferrocenium couple is often used as a reference in electrochemistry.  The standard potential of ferrocene-ferrocenium is dependent on specific electrochemical conditions.

Preparation
Commercially available, this compound may be prepared by oxidizing ferrocene typically with ferric salts followed by addition of fluoroboric acid.  A variety of other oxidants work well also, such as nitrosyl tetrafluoroborate.  Many analogous ferrocenium salts are known.

References

Ferrocenes
Tetrafluoroborates
Oxidizing agents